Wolfgang Edgar Richter (17 August 1926 – 2016) was a Brazilian sailor. He competed at the 1948 Summer Olympics, the 1952 Summer Olympics and the 1960 Summer Olympics.

References

External links
 

1926 births
2016 deaths
Brazilian male sailors (sport)
Olympic sailors of Brazil
Sailors at the 1948 Summer Olympics – Firefly
Sailors at the 1952 Summer Olympics – Dragon
Sailors at the 1960 Summer Olympics – Flying Dutchman
Sportspeople from São Paulo
Snipe class sailors